Manny Pacquiao vs. Yordenis Ugás, was the welterweight professional boxing match contested between former eight-division world champion, Manny Pacquiao, and WBA (Super) champion, Yordenis Ugás. The bout took place on August 21, 2021, at the T-Mobile Arena in Paradise, Nevada, U.S. This was Manny Pacquiao's final boxing match before his retirement later that year to focus more on politics.

Background 

On May 21, 2021, former eight-division world champion Manny Pacquiao made the unexpected announcement on his social media that he would face undefeated WBC and IBF welterweight champion Errol Spence Jr. on August 21 in Las Vegas on Fox pay-per-view (PPV). Premier Boxing Champions and Fox confirmed the news, and it was reported that both men have signed contracts to face each other. The two men had previously already met more than two years prior on March 16, 2019, in the ring following Spence's unanimous decision victory over Mikey Garcia in Arlington, Texas, when both Pacquiao and Spence indicated they would relish the chance to fight each other. On June 23, the venue was officially announced as the T-Mobile Arena.

On August 10, it was announced that Spence would be replaced by WBA (Super) champion Yordenis Ugás, after being forced to pull out of the bout with Pacquiao due to suffering an injury to his left eye.

Professional wrestling promotion WWE hosted their annual SummerSlam pay-per-view event on the same night at the nearby Allegiant Stadium, which raised concerns over whether or not fans would be able to attend or watch both shows. WWE had planned to have SummerSlam end with enough time for fans to leave the Allegiant Stadium and make it over to the T-Mobile Arena to watch the main event fight between Pacquiao and Ugás, or for those watching at home, enough time to switch PPV channels. SummerSlam ended just as Pacquiao made his entrance.

National Anthem singers 
  – Lupang Hinirang by J. Rey Soul of Black Eyed Peas
  – Star Spangled Banner by Meangirl

Fight card 

 & WBO International Featherweight title

Media coverage

References

2021 in boxing
Boxing in Las Vegas
Ugás